Voltec, formerly known as E-Flex, is a General Motors powertrain released in November 2010. The Voltec architecture is primarily a plug-in capable, battery-dominant electric vehicle with additional fossil fuel powered series and parallel hybrid capabilities.

Voltec vehicles like the Chevrolet Volt are all electrically driven, feature common drivetrain components, and will be able to create electricity on board using either a fuel cell or a gasoline motor to generate electricity. Regenerative braking contributes to the on-board electricity generation.

Voltec is a portmanteau word from Volt, Vortec and technology.

Drivetrain
The Voltec drivetrain was initially demonstrated as E-Flex in the 2007 Chevrolet Volt concept vehicle that appeared in the North American International Auto Show which introduced the E-Flex drive system as an attempt to standardize many components of possible future electrically propelled vehicles, and to allow multiple interchangeable electricity-generating systems. The initial design as envisioned in the Volt combines an electric motor and  lithium-ion battery plug-in system with a small engine (1.4 liter) powered by gasoline linked to a  generator. Ordinarily, the Volt charged while at home overnight (plug-in hybrid-mode) through a charging port. A full charge reportedly takes 10-12 hours from a standard North American 120 V, 15 A household outlet, or 4 hours from a 240 V 15 A SAE J1772 electrical vehicle supply. The Refreshed 2016 Volt featured a 1.5L I4 engine generator that runs on regular, rather than premium gasoline, and an upgraded battery pack giving about 52 miles per charge vs. the 1st generation's 41 . 

Since the electrical drivetrain is not affected by the method used to charge the batteries, several options could be available for acting as an electrical power source. The primary configuration originally specified in the Volt promotional literature used a turbocharged 1.0-liter engine with three cylinders, a flex-fuel engine capable of running gasoline or E85 (85% ethanol, 15% gasoline), although this engine never made it to production vehicles.

Other engine-driven power options mentioned were a pure ethanol (E100) engine, a diesel engine capable of running biodiesel fuel, or even a hydrogen fuel cell, once that technology becomes practical. (The Ford Airstream concept, which debuted at the same show, uses a fuel cell plug-in hybrid design.)

Another power-source option, one that does not rely on an internal-combustion engine at all, was demonstrated in the Volt fuel cell concept vehicle, which appeared at the 2007 Shanghai Auto Show.  Due to the high cost of fuel cells compared to newer lower cost lithium batteries, General Motors has publicly suggested that the Volt will not be using fuel cells in any near term production vehicles.

The general layout of the initial production platform is considered by some to be a plug-in series hybrid design (since mechanical power initially drives the generator, which in turn charges the battery pack), despite its transmission design that makes it, by definition, a parallel hybrid. Power is drained from the batteries to run the electrical motors which move the vehicle. The internal combustion engine can run at a constant speed for both optimal efficiency and mechanical simplicity (i.e., there is no need for variable cam phasing).  The Voltec, like the Prius, uses a planetary gearset to couple power from two sources to the wheels. Unlike the Prius, the Voltec only rarely drives the wheels with mechanical assist from the engine, and only when battery charge is depleted. The Voltec could therefore be considered a power-split hybrid.

The lithium-ion battery in the initial Voltec production vehicle is kept in a state-of-charge (SOC) range of between 30% and 80%, with the on-board generator that works to maintain the battery at the 30% charge level.

GM has decided on a new descriptive terminology distinct from calling it a hybrid.  They are calling the Volt an E-REV, for "extended-range electric vehicle".  At high demand in charge sustaining mode, the motor output stays high to build up a charge. In this mode, the internal combustion engine is not connected to the planetary transmission through the motor generator.

Vehicles

Production vehicles, Voltec Generation 1

 Chevrolet Volt (first generation) (also known as Holden Volt and Opel/Vauxhall Ampera)
 Cadillac ELR

GM chose its Global Delta II compact vehicle architecture for its first Voltec applications. Volt Production began in November 2010 with the first Volts delivered to retail customers in December 2010

Production vehicles, Voltec Generation 2

 Chevrolet Volt (second generation), MY 2016, Plug-In Hybrid
 Chevrolet Malibu Hybrid MY 2016, Hybrid
 Cadillac CT6 PHEV, 2017, Plug-In Hybrid

Concept vehicles
 Cadillac Converj
 Cadillac Provoq
 Opel Flextreme
 Opel Flextreme GT/E
 Opel Monza Concept

See also 
List of GM engines

References

Voltec
Hybrid powertrain
General Motors hybrid technologies